BCR Tower is an office building located in the city of Sibiu, Romania. It stands at a height of 56 meters and has 13 floors, with a total surface area of 12,000 m2.

External links

Skyscrapers in Romania
Office buildings completed in 2001